Little Miami High School is the only high school in the Little Miami Schools school district. It is located in Morrow, Ohio, in the United States. It serves the Morrow, Hamilton Township, Maineville, and Butlerville areas of Warren County.

Little Miami High School is a site for the national High Schools That Work program. The program recognized the school as the top performing high school site in Ohio.

Through their relationship with the Warren County Career Center (WCCC), a vocational school serving Little Miami High School, students who elect to complete their high school education at WCCC can earn college credits toward a bachelor of science in Information Technology degree from University of Cincinnati. Students who complete the program and associated required college-level academic courses with a 'C' or better would be automatically accepted to enter UC School of Information Technology as a sophomore.

In 2007, annual scholarships were created for Little Miami High seniors, by the Kevin C. Barnhill Memorial Scholarship and Community Outreach Fund, to award students who best personify athletic and academic achievement and leadership qualities.

A notable graduate of Little Miami High School is Mark Whitacre, the highest-level executive in FBI history to become a whistleblower, and whom the FBI touted as a national hero.

References

External links
 Official site
 District site

High schools in Warren County, Ohio
Educational institutions established in 2000
Public high schools in Ohio
2000 establishments in Ohio